Horezmia is an extinct Mesozoic genus of prehistoric salamanders. The fossils have been found in Russia. It is comparable to modern advanced salamanders, though its phylogenetic placement within Salamandroidea is uncertain.

See also

 Prehistoric amphibian
 List of prehistoric amphibians

References 

Mesozoic salamanders
Fossils of Russia
Prehistoric vertebrate genera